Van Antwerpen is a surname. Notable people with the surname include:

Franklin Van Antwerpen (1941-2016), American judge
Maria van Antwerpen (1719–1781), Dutch soldier and cross dresser
Patrick Van Antwerpen (1944–1990), Belgian film director

See also
Gazet van Antwerpen, Belgian newspaper

Dutch-language surnames
Surnames of Dutch origin